Battery L, 1st Ohio Light Artillery was an artillery battery that served in the Union Army during the American Civil War.

Service
The battery was organized in Portsmouth, Ohio on October 8, 1861 and mustered in at Camp Dennison near Cincinnati, Ohio for a three-year enlistment on January 20, 1862. The regiment was organized as early as 1860 under Ohio's militia laws, under Colonel James Barnett.

The battery was attached to Landers' Division, Army of the Potomac, to March 1862. Artillery, Shields' 2nd Division, Banks' V Corps and Department of the Shenandoah to May 1862. Artillery, Shields' Division, Department of the Rappahannock, to June 1862. Alexandria, Virginia, Military District of Washington, D.C., to September 1862. Artillery, 3rd Division, V Corps, Army of the Potomac, to October 1862. Artillery, 2nd Division, V Corps, to May 1863. Artillery Brigade, V Corps, to April 1864. Camp Barry, Defenses of Washington, D.C.. XXII Corps, to May 1864. 2nd Brigade, Hardin's Division, XXII Corps, to July 1864. Artillery, 1st Division, XIX Corps, Middle Military Division, to August 1864. Reserve Division, Department of West Virginia, to September 1864. Artillery Brigade, Department of West Virginia, to January 1865. 1st Separate Brigade. 3rd Division, West Virginia, to April 1865. Artillery, 2nd Division, Department of West Virginia, to July 1865.

Battery L, 1st Ohio Light Artillery mustered out of service at Columbus, Ohio on July 4, 1865.

Detailed service
Moved to Patterson's Creek, Va., January 20–27, 1862. Advance on Winchester, Va., March 7–15, 1862. Reconnaissance to Strasburg March 19–20. Battle of Winchester March 23. Occupation of Mt. Jackson April 17. March to Fredericksburg May 12–21, and return to Front Royal May 25–30. Moved to Alexandria June 29, and duty in the defenses of Washington until September. Movement to Falmouth, Va., October–November. Battle of Fredericksburg December 12–15. At Falmouth until April. 1863. Chancellorsville Campaign April 27 – May 6. Battle of Chancellorsville May 1–5. Gettysburg Campaign June 11 – July 24. Battle of Gettysburg July 1–3. Duty on line of the Rappahannock and Rapidan until October. Bristoe Campaign October 9–22. Advance to line of the Rappahannock November 7–8. Rappahannock Station November 7. Mine Run Campaign November 26 – December 2. Duty at Camp Barry and at Forts Sumner and Kearney, Defenses of Washington, until July 1864. Repulse of Early's attack on Washington July 11–12. Expedition to Snicker's Gap July 14–23. Sheridan's Shenandoah Valley Campaign. Berryville September 3. Battle of Opequan, Winchester, September 19. Fisher's Hill September 22. Battle of Cedar Creek October 19. Duty at Winchester until December 28, and at New Creek until June 30, 1865. Ordered to Columbus, Ohio, June 30.

Casualties
The battery lost a total of 24 men during service; 1 officer and 7 enlisted men killed or mortally wounded, 1 officer and 15 enlisted men died of disease.

Commanders
 Captain Franklin C. Gibbs
 Lieutenant Frederick Dorries – commanded at the Battle of Fredericksburg

See also

 List of Ohio Civil War units
 Ohio in the Civil War

References
 Dyer, Frederick H.  A Compendium of the War of the Rebellion (Des Moines, IA:  Dyer Pub. Co.), 1908.
 Gildea, James Frederick. A Magnificent Irishman from Appalachia: The Letters of Lt. James Gildea, First Ohio Light Artillery Battery L (Milford, OH:  Little Miami Pub. Co.), 2003. 
 Ohio Roster Commission. Official Roster of the Soldiers of the State of Ohio in the War on the Rebellion, 1861–1865, Compiled Under the Direction of the Roster Commission (Akron, OH: Werner Co.), 1886–1895.
 Reid, Whitelaw. Ohio in the War: Her Statesmen, Her Generals, and Soldiers (Cincinnati, OH: Moore, Wilstach, & Baldwin), 1868.
Attribution

External links
 Ohio in the Civil War: Battery L, 1st Ohio Light Artillery by Larry Stevens
 Battery marker at Gettysburg battlefield
 Battery L, 1st Ohio Light Artillery living history organization

Military units and formations established in 1861
Military units and formations disestablished in 1865
Units and formations of the Union Army from Ohio
O